Kohnab-e Bala (also Romanized as Kohnāb-e Bālā; also known as Do Āb-e Bālā, Konāb, and Konāb-e Bālā) is a village in Hoseyniyeh Rural District, Alvar-e Garmsiri District, Andimeshk County, Khuzestan Province, Iran. At the 2006 census, its population was 29, in 6 families.

References 

Populated places in Andimeshk County